Thalanyji (also spelt Dhalandji, Thalanyji, and other variations) and Binigura /Pinikura (also spelt Pinigura, Binnigoora, and other variations), are two closely related languages from the Pilbara region of Western Australia. They are part of the Kanyara subgroup of the Pama–Nyungan language family.

They are spoken by the Thalanyji and Pinikura peoples respectively. Both languages are thought to be extinct; there were six speakers of Thalanyji recorded in 2004/5, and ten speakers of Pinikura recorded in 1975, but none since in either language.

According to Peter Austin, Pinikura, Thalanyji, Payungu and Purdana "should probably be classified as belonging to the Kanyara subgroup".

References 

Kanyara languages